Saint-Jean-de-Touslas is a former commune in the Rhône department in eastern France. On 1 January 2018, it was merged into the new commune of Beauvallon. Its population was 863 in 2019.

See also
Communes of the Rhône department

References

Former communes of Rhône (department)
Populated places disestablished in 2018